Coloma High School is a high school located in Coloma, Michigan.  It is a Class B school according to the MHSAA.

References

External links
Official website

Schools in Berrien County, Michigan
Educational institutions established in 1931
Public high schools in Michigan
1931 establishments in Michigan